Damion Lowe (born 5 May 1993) is a Jamaican professional footballer who plays as a defender for Major League Soccer club Philadelphia Union and the Jamaica national team.

Early life
Born in Kingston, Jamaica, Damion Lowe is the son of former Jamaican international Onandi Lowe. Damion attended Camperdown High School in Kingston and played youth soccer for Jamaican club Harbour View F.C.

In 2011, Lowe started attending the University of Hartford. While playing three season for the Hartford Hawks, Lowe was named to the America East All-Tournament Team in his first season and in his final year for the Hawks, he was named to the Second Team All-Northeast region, First Team All-America East, and All-America East Tournament Team. In three years, Lowe played 44 games, scoring 8 goals and assisting 3 more.

Club career

Reading United
Playing in the PDL, Lowe appeared in 10 regular season matches, scoring once while helping Reading allow a division best 12 goals in 14 games. Lowe was also named to the PDL best 11 and started two games for Reading in the 2013 Lamar Hunt U.S. Open Cup.

Seattle Sounders FC
Lowe signed a Generation Adidas deal with Major League Soccer. The Jamaican defender was selected eight overall in the 2014 MLS SuperDraft by the Seattle Sounders FC, making him the third Jamaican to be selected in the Draft, behind Andre Blake and Andre Lewis.

Minnesota United
Lowe was sent on a season long loan to Minnesota United Where he led their defense line and was nominated for the NASL young player of the year award.

IK Start
In August 2017, Lowe transferred to IK Start.
His contract was terminated on 15 May 2020.

Phoenix Rising
Lowe was signed by USL Championship side Phoenix Rising on 16 September 2020.

Al Ittihad
Lowe signed a two-year contract with Egyptian Premier League side Al Ittihad Alexandria on 28 November 2020. In the 2020–21 season, he made 27 league appearances, scoring one goal. On 9 January 2022, Lowe terminated his contract with Al Ittihad after making only three appearances that season.

Inter Miami
On 16 January 2022, Lowe returned to the United States, signing a two-year deal with MLS club Inter Miami.

Philadelphia Union
On 25 January 2023, Lowe was traded to Philadelphia Union in exchange for $225,000 in General Allocation Money and a 2024 MLS SuperDraft natural first round draft pick.

Career statistics

Club

International career
Lowe represented the Jamaica National Team at the 2013 CONCACAF U-20 Championship and also in the U-23 Olympic Qualifying. Lowe made his senior international debut on 11 October 2016 versus Guyana.

International goals
Scores and results list Jamaica's goal tally first.

Honours

Seattle Sounders
MLS Cup: 2016
Supporters' Shield: 2014
U.S. Open Cup: 2014

Phoenix Rising
Western Conference (playoffs): 2020

Jamaica
Caribbean Cup runner-up: 2017
CONCACAF Gold Cup runner-up: 2017

Individual
 CONCACAF Gold Cup Best XI: 2021

References

External links 
 

1993 births
Living people
Sportspeople from Kingston, Jamaica
Jamaican footballers
Association football defenders
Hartford Hawks men's soccer players
Reading United A.C. players
Seattle Sounders FC draft picks
Seattle Sounders FC players
Tacoma Defiance players
Minnesota United FC (2010–2016) players
Tampa Bay Rowdies players
IK Start players
Phoenix Rising FC players
Al Ittihad Alexandria Club players
Inter Miami CF players
Philadelphia Union players
USL League Two players
USL Championship players
North American Soccer League players
Norwegian First Division players
Eliteserien players
Egyptian Premier League players
Jamaica under-20 international footballers
Jamaica international footballers
2017 CONCACAF Gold Cup players
2019 CONCACAF Gold Cup players
2021 CONCACAF Gold Cup players
Jamaican expatriate footballers
Jamaican expatriate sportspeople in the United States
Jamaican expatriate sportspeople in Norway
Jamaican expatriate sportspeople in Egypt
Expatriate soccer players in the United States
Expatriate footballers in Norway
Expatriate footballers in Egypt
Major League Soccer players